Sonia Seymour Mikich (born 13 July 1951 in Oxford) is a German TV journalist.

Education
After studying political sciences, sociology, and philosophy from 1972–1979 at the RWTH Aachen University. She worked as research associate with the institute's Arnold-Gehlen Research Group. In 1985 she received a scholarship from the German Marshall Fund.

Career 
 Since 1984 editor and reporter for the WDR's foreign TV broadcasting group
 1992–1998 – Correspondent in Moscow, since 1995 as first woman to serve as head of the broadcasting studio 
 1998–2001 – Head of the ARD studio in Paris
 Since 2002 chief editor and presenter of the ARD's Monitor newsmagazine
 Since 2004 head of the ARD/WDR documentary magazine Die story, WDR TV, Cologne
 Since 2012 moderator of weekly talk show Presseclub
 2014–2018 – Editor-in-Chief, WDR TV, Cologne

Her work as chronicler of the First Chechen War in Moscow was awarded in 1998 with the Bundesverdienstkreuz.

On 17 November 2016, Seymour Mikich and Der Spiegel editor-in-chief Klaus Brinkbäumer conducted the only TV interview with President Barack Obama on his last official trip to Germany.

Other activities
 Civis Media Foundation, Member of the Advisory Board (since 2013)

Filmography 

 1993, Mordsliebe Moskau, WDR 3
 1993, Brudermord – Putsch 93, ARD
 1993, Davonfliegen wie Ikarus – Aussteiger im neuen Rußland, WDR
 1995, Mascha, 15, hat viele Kerle... Jugend in Rußland, WDR
 (mit Telestar 1996 ausgezeichnet)
 1995, Der Gotteskrieger und die Kellerfrauen, ARD
 1996, Das Duell – Jelzin gegen Sjuganow, ARD
 1996, Mein Moskau, WDR
 1996, Die Krönung – Portrait Boris Jelzin zur Wiederwahl, ARD
 1996, Zar Boris und die Brandstifter – Tschetschenienkrieg und die Ursachen, ARD
 1997, Brotlos, aber hochgerüstet – Armee in der Krise, NDR
 1997, Polarkreis 3. Klasse, WDR
 1997, Moskau Neon, Moskau Samt – Abschied, ARD
 1998, Gralssucher und Troubadoure – Pyrenäenreise, ARD
 1999, Die Sängerin – Korsikareise, ARD
 2000, Sturm und Licht, Bretagnereise, ARD
 2000, Spur des Kondor, Peru-Reise, ARD
 2000, Bretagne-Reise, WDR
 2000, Korsika-Reise, WDR
 2000, Flug in den Tod – Concorde-Absturz, ARD
 2001, Provence auf Nebenwegen, ARD
 2001, Provence: blau-weiss-roter Traum, ARD

Books 
Der Wille zum Glück
Planet Moskau – Geschichten aus dem neuen Russland

References

External links 
 Homepage at the WDR
 Was nun, ferner Bärtiger? (What's next, bearded one?) by Sonia Mikich, die tageszeitung, February 6, 2006  – English translation at signandsight.com
 Interview with Joseph E. Stiglitz, ARD/Monitor, 14 May 2002

German television journalists
German women journalists
German people of Serbian descent
20th-century German journalists
21st-century German journalists
1951 births
Living people
People from Oxford
RWTH Aachen University alumni
Recipients of the Cross of the Order of Merit of the Federal Republic of Germany
ARD (broadcaster) people
Westdeutscher Rundfunk people
20th-century German women
21st-century German women